Hans von Hayek (19 December 1869, in Vienna – 17 January 1940, in Munich) was an Austrian-born German Impressionist painter.

Biography 
In 1891, after a short period of study at the University of Applied Arts in Vienna, he moved to Munich and enrolled at the Academy of Fine Arts, where he studied with Gabriel von Hackl, Wilhelm von Lindenschmit and Carl von Marr. Later, he met the animal painter, Heinrich von Zügel, who ultimately had the most influence on his style.

After leaving Munich, he stayed in Olching for a time then, in 1900, settled at the artists' colony in Dachau. There, he started a private school devoted to plein aire painting, which he operated until 1915. Many notable painters studied there, including , Hermann Stenner, Anna Klein and Norbertine Bresslern-Roth. One of his students, Carl Thiemann, wrote in his memoirs that the local farmers frequently complained about them trampling the grass and leaving oil paints behind.

The financial success of his school enabled him to make frequent study trips throughout Western and Northern Europe. As a member of the board of the Munich Secession, he helped organize their 1904 exhibition at the Staatliche Antikensammlungen. He also exhibited with the Deutscher Künstlerbund and, in 1908, became a German citizen.

During World War I, he worked as a battle painter. Following the war, he took extended trips to Indonesia and Ceylon. Many of his works were lost in the fire that destroyed the Munich Glaspalast in 1931. Others were lost a few years after his death when his studio was hit during a bombing in 1945.

Hayek is commemorated in the scientific name of a species of Sumatran lizard, Bronchocela hayeki.

References

Further reading
 Hayek, Hans von in: Thieme-Becker: Allgemeines Lexikon der Bildenden Künstler von der Antike bis zur Gegenwart. Vol. 18, E. A. Seemann, Leipzig 2008.  
 Hayek, Hans von in: Hans Vollmer (ed.) Allgemeines Lexikon der Bildenden Künstler des XX. Jahrhunderts. Vol.2, E. A. Seemann, Leipzig 1999

External links 

ArtNet: More works by Hayek.
Hans von Hayek @ the Dachau website.

1869 births
1940 deaths
19th-century Austrian painters
19th-century German male artists
Austrian male painters
20th-century German painters
20th-century German male artists
German male painters
German Impressionist painters
Austrian emigrants to Germany
German people of Czech descent
German landscape painters
World War I artists